Derek Austin Cornelius (born 25 November 1997) is a Canadian professional soccer player who plays as a centre-back for Allsvenskan club Malmö FF and the Canadian national team.

Early life
Cornelius was born in Ajax, Ontario to a Barbadian father and a Jamaican mother. Cornelius started playing when he was selected as a younger player for the 1996 House League All-Star team. He was then selected by the Ajax Thunder under-8 team at six years old. In the season after that, he was the Unionville Milliken Challenge Cup Champions Most Valuable Player. At the U11 level, he won the C.O.V.I. Championship and was proclaimed the Most Valuable Player.

In 2012, he played in the Oviedo Cup with PFC CSKA Moscow in Spain, then he played in the Milk Cup by CSKA Moscow in Northern Ireland where he led the team scoring four goals in the tournament. He ended that year by being invited to the CSKA Moscow Reserve Camp and by playing in the U21 Provincial and Men's Regional leagues, scoring 22 goals in 30 games.

In 2013, he was selected for the Canadian national under-17 team for camp in Florida and Costa Rica, and was later selected for the CONCACAF World Cup U17 Qualifier pre-camp in Florida. He was also selected for the Canadian national under-16 Team for the Torneo delle Nazioni tournament in Italy. That same year he was invited to Hungary for trials with Nyíregyháza Spartacus FC and Győri ETO FC in March.

Club career

Early career
In January 2014, he moved to Germany. He began training with VfB Lübeck U19 team. He spent two seasons with the main team, but was unable to play due to FIFA rules for underaged players. He became eligible to play effective on 1 January 2016. With VfB Lübeck he won the Schleswig-Holstein Cup two years in a row and made an appearance in the 2015–16 Regionalliga Nord.

In the summer of 2016, he moved to VfR Neumünster playing with them the first half of the season.

Javor Ivanjica
During the winter break of the 2016–17 season, Cornelius was signed by Serbian SuperLiga side FK Javor Ivanjica after successful trials. He made his league debut on 29 April 2017, in an away game against FK Radnički Niš. Javor head coach Srđan Vasiljević converted Cornelius from a forward into a centre-back.

Vancouver Whitecaps FC
On 18 January 2019, Cornelius returned to his native Canada and signed with MLS side Vancouver Whitecaps FC. He made his debut for the Whitecaps on 2 March in their 2019 MLS season opener against Minnesota United. Cornelius scored his first goal for the club on 18 May against Sporting Kansas City.

In July 2021 the Whitecaps announced Cornelius had been loaned to Panetolikos of the Super League Greece until December 2022.

Malmö FF
In December 2022 Vancouver announced Cornelius had been transferred to Allsvenskan side Malmö FF. He signed a contract through 2026 with the Scandinavian club. Cornelius made his competitive debut for his new club against Skövde AIK in the Svenska Cupen on February 19, 2023. He scored his first goal for Malmö on March 5 against Degerfors IF, winning the match.

International career
Cornelius was part of the Canadian U17 camp in February 2013. He was called up to a U23 camp on 8 January 2018. In May 2018, Cornelius was named to Canada's under-21 squad for the 2018 Toulon Tournament and would earn rave reviews for his performance at the tournament. In 2018, he was named the Canada Soccer Youth International Player of the Year.

On 12 March 2018, Cornelius received his first call up to the Canadian senior side for a friendly against New Zealand to be played on 24 March 2018. He would make his debut for Canada on 9 September 2018, starting and playing the entire match in an 8–0 victory over the U.S. Virgin Islands. On 30 May 2019, Cornelius was named to the 23-man squad for the 2019 CONCACAF Gold Cup.

He was named to the Canadian U-23 roster for the 2020 CONCACAF Men's Olympic Qualifying Championship on 10 March 2021.

In November 2022, Cornelius was named to Canada's squad for the 2022 FIFA World Cup.

Career statistics

Club

International

Honours

Club 
VfB Lübeck
 Schleswig-Holstein Cup: 2015, 2016

Individual 
 CONCACAF Men's Olympic Qualifying Best XI: 2020
Canadian Men's Youth International Player of the Year: 2018

References

External links
 

1997 births
Living people
People from Ajax, Ontario
Canadian sportspeople of Jamaican descent
Canadian people of Barbadian descent
Canadian soccer players
Canadian expatriate soccer players
Association football forwards
VfB Lübeck players
FK Javor Ivanjica players
Vancouver Whitecaps FC players
Panetolikos F.C. players
Regionalliga players
Oberliga (football) players
Serbian SuperLiga players
Major League Soccer players
Super League Greece players
Expatriate footballers in Germany
Expatriate footballers in Serbia
Expatriate soccer players in the United States
Expatriate footballers in Greece
Canadian expatriates in Germany
Canadian expatriates in Serbia
Canadian expatriates in Greece
Canadian expatriate sportspeople in Germany
Canadian expatriate sportspeople in Serbia
Canadian expatriate sportspeople in the United States
Canadian expatriate sportspeople in Greece
Black Canadian soccer players
2019 CONCACAF Gold Cup players
2022 FIFA World Cup players
Soccer people from Ontario
Canada men's international soccer players
Unionville Milliken SC players